The Crowded Room is an upcoming drama anthology television series created by Akiva Goldsman for Apple TV+, with season one taking inspiration from the novel The Minds of Billy Milligan by Daniel Keyes.

Premise 
A seasonal anthology series that explores true and inspirational stories of those who have struggled, and learned to successfully live with mental illness, with season one inspired by Daniel Keyes' nonfiction novel The Minds of Billy Milligan and based on Akiva Goldsman's life.

Cast 
 Tom Holland as Danny Sullivan
 Amanda Seyfried as Rya
 Emmy Rossum as Candy Sullivan
 Will Chase as Marlin Reid
 Sasha Lane as Ariana
 Christopher Abbott as Stan
 Emma Laird as Isabel
 Jason Isaacs as Jack Lamb
 Lior Raz as Yitzhak
 Henry Eikenberry as Doug
 Henry Zaga as Philip
 Thomas Sadoski as Matty Dunne
 Laila Robins as Susie
 Sam Vartholomeos as Mike
 Levon Hawke as Jonny

Production

Development 
In April 2021, Akiva Goldsman was set to write The Crowded Room, a 10-episode anthology television series with season one as the adaptation of Daniel Keyes' nonfiction novel The Minds of Billy Milligan for Apple TV+. Goldsman was also set to produce the series through his Weed Road company with Tom Holland, Alexandra Milchan through EMJAG Productions, and Arnon Milchan, Yariv Milchan and Michael Schaefer through New Regency. The first season was later revealed to actually be based on Goldsman's own life with inspiration from Keyes' book. Kornél Mundruczó was hired to direct the first season and serve as an executive producer as well alongside Suzanne Heathcote. Writers for the first season include Akiva Goldsman, Henrietta Ashworth, Jessica Ashworth, Suzanne Heathcote, Cortney Norris and Gregory Lessans.

Casting 
In April 2021, Holland was cast in the lead role of season one, initially believed to be Billy Milligan. In February 2022, it was revealed that Holland's character would actually be named Danny Sullivan (loosely based on Milligan), while Amanda Seyfried, Emmy Rossum, Will Chase,  Sasha Lane, Christopher Abbott and Emma Laird would be added to the cast. In May, Jason Isaacs and Lior Raz were cast.

Filming 
Filming on the series began on March 31 and wrapped on September 28, 2022 in New York City.

References

External links 
 

2020s American anthology television series
2020s American drama television series
Apple TV+ original programming
English-language television shows
Mental disorders in television
Television series created by Akiva Goldsman
Television shows based on non-fiction books
Television shows filmed in New York City
Upcoming drama television series